This is an alphabetical list of countries by GDP published by IMF. This list includes GDP (nominal), GDP (nominal) per capita, GDP (PPP), GDP (PPP) per capita, Population, and PPP.

Circa 2016
Old GDP published by IMF; Irmak Çakıroğlu

2015
2015 GDP published by IMF in October 2016
 Data from Hong Kong and Macao is included in China's estimates
 Kosovo and Syria are excluded because their data in 2015 are not available.

2014
2014 GDP published by IMF in October 2015
 Hong Kong is excluded because it is part of China.
 Kosovo and Syria are excluded because their data in 2016 are not available.

See also
 List of countries by GDP (nominal)
 List of countries by GDP (nominal) per capita
 List of countries by GDP (PPP)
 List of countries by GDP (PPP) per capita
 List of countries by past and projected GDP (nominal)
 List of countries by past and projected GDP (PPP)

References

External links
 IMF website
 2015 World Economic Outlook (WEO) Database
 Archive of the WEO databases, from 1999 to 2011

IMF GDP
International Monetary Fund